Plante is a surname.

Plante may also refer to:

 Planté (crater), a lunar crater
 Planté cell, a type of electrochemical cell, a secondary battery of the lead-acid type

See also

 Laplante (disambiguation)
 
 
 
 Plant (disambiguation)